José Gregorio Lemos Rivas (born 4 June 1991) is a Colombian athlete with cerebral palsy. He represented Colombia at the 2020 Summer Paralympics in Tokyo, Japan and he won the gold medal in the men's javelin throw F38 event.

He is the younger brother of Sandra Lemos.

References

External links 
 

Living people
1991 births
Colombian male javelin throwers
Track and field athletes with cerebral palsy
Athletes (track and field) at the 2020 Summer Paralympics
Medalists at the 2020 Summer Paralympics
Paralympic gold medalists for Colombia
Paralympic medalists in athletics (track and field)
Paralympic athletes of Colombia
Sportspeople from Valle del Cauca Department
20th-century Colombian people
21st-century Colombian people